Grace Lee is a Korean lifestyle host in the Philippines.

Grace Lee is also the name of:

 Grace Lee Boggs (1915–2015), author, anti-racist activist and feminist
 Grace Lee Whitney (1930–2015), American actress
 Grace Lee (director), Korean American director and producer
 Grace Etsuko Lee, founder of Grace Lee International
 Jin-gyu "Grace" Lee (born 2000), Korean American ice hockey player
 Grace Lee (politician), politician in New York